Ilse Annoeska de Lange (born 13 May 1977), better known as Ilse DeLange, is a Dutch country and pop rock singer-songwriter. As a member of The Common Linnets, she finished in second place at the Eurovision Song Contest 2014.

Biography
Ilse Annoeska de Lange was born on 13 May 1977 in Almelo, Netherlands. She started her career at the age of 8 as a lip-synching artist, which won her several contests. DeLange drew greater attention after switching to a live repertoire in both regional and national talent shows in Hilversum, the city where most Dutch TV-programs are recorded. This helped her book some live-performances on national television. She formed a duo with guitarist Joop van Liefland, who introduced her to country music.  In the spring of 1994 Ilse took part in the annual SCPO talent show in Oss. There she performed together with guitarist Joop van Liefland and won in the solo artist category. The SCPO's permanent jury team included musicians-music journalists John Smulders and Henk Korsten (Country Gazette).

In 1994, DeLange performed at the Dutch Country Music Awards. Despite positive reviews, nothing happened with her career. She did get in touch with representatives of Warner Music but it took several years of negotiation before they decided to offer her a contract. That same year, she participated in the "Zangfestival der Onbekenden" ("Song Contest of the Unknown") in the Dutch city of Eindhoven. With her implementation of Daddy's Hands by Holly Dunn and The Song Remembers When by Trisha Yearwood, she won the contest and got the opportunity to record a demo. In 1996, DeLange drew the attention from the A&R-manager of Dutch record company BMI Music, Henk-Jan Smits. He persuaded her to join the occasional popgroup Wij and they released the single "De Oorlog Meegemaakt" ("Experienced The War"). However the single did not chart the Dutch Top 40.

1998–1999: Breakthrough with World of Hurt and Dear John
In 1998 while being a member of the group Cash On Delivery, she traveled to Nashville, US to record her debut album World of Hurt with top producer Barry Beckett. She became well known in the Netherlands, because her album was recorded in the capital of country music. Partly because of that, her debut single I'm Not So Tough charted and peaked at No. 35 in the Dutch Top 40. Her album received big success in her home country, going 5× Platinum. In the Netherlands, Ilse received a TMF Award and an Edison Award for her musical success in 1999. Although the album was a huge success, next singles World of Hurt, I'd Be Yours and When We Don't Talk didn't chart. Unfortunately World of Hurt wasn't released in the States, despite some interest due to guest vocals from Vince Gill, and Ilse's cover of Beth Nielsen Chapman's song World of Hurt, and Patty Larkin's song Lonely Too.

A year after DeLange released live-album Dear John, an album full of covers by John Hiatt, after a very successful performance at the "Marlboro Flashbacks". Tobacco brand Marlboro organised the tour in a manner of promotion and asked famous Dutch singers to cover their favourite artist. She even went on a mini-tour in support of the album, which lasted several months during 1999. The album went platinum in the Netherlands (with sales of 80,000 copies).

2000–2002: Livin' on Love and fatigue
Rumours of a new album were heard mid-2000. The first single of the album, Livin' on Love (written by Craig Fuller and Gary Nicholson), was released in October and peaked at No. 37 in the Dutch Top 40. November saw the release of her sophomore studio album Livin' on Love, which was a musical departure from her debut, leaning more toward pop/rock. The country music-scene wasn't as excited by this album. Although there was a good amount of promotion for the album, it could not compete with the success of World of Hurt, hitting its peak at No. 5 but still going platinum. Second single I Still Cry didn't chart. In 2001 DeLange started her Livin' on Love Tour, performing in many theaters and concert halls throughout her home country.

Meanwhile, Warner Music attempted to promote this release as her "breakthrough" release in the United States. Although "World Of Hurt" was planned to be released in the States, the record labels in America thought the album was too old-fashioned for the zero's. Ilse set her hopes on the release of "Livin' on Love", but once again the album was not released for unknown reasons. There were rumours that the American label didn't like the pop/rock-sound of the album. Due to all the business problems and a heavy tour schedule, DeLange became physically exhausted. During a performance in Paradiso, (Amsterdam), she experienced vocal problems and emotionally told her fans that she couldn't continue the performance. On doctor's advice she took a few weeks rest.

2003: Clean Up and small decline in success

In 2002, DeLange and her partner Bart Vergoossen, who is the drummer of her live band, went to America for nine months to work on a new album. During the recording sessions DeLange took a greater creative role in her music, including receiving songwriting credit for the entire album. Her writing on was autobiographical. In April 2003 she released Clean Up, her third studio album. This album continued with the pop/rock-sound she experimented with on Livin' on Love. The album debuted at No. 1 in the charts and got certified gold. Despite the success, the first single No Reason To Be Shy was a commercial failure and the record company decided not to release any further singles, but rather focus on a compilation album. This album was released in October of that same year and was called Here I Am. The album spawned two singles, Wouldn't That Be Something and All The Answers, which both were a commercial failure.

2004–2007: Search for new record company and The Great Escape
At the beginning of 2004, the Dutch section of record company Warner Music was disbanded and Ilse lost her contract. A few months later, she collaborated on the song Blue with Italian singer Zucchero. The song was a moderate success in the Netherlands, reaching No. 23 in the Dutch Top 40. There was no information about a new record deal, but Ilse stated that she was working on her future.

In the end of 2005 she went on tour, without releasing a new album or even having a record company. Every concert sold out. She began working with producer Patrick Leonard on a new album, which helped with signing a new record deal. Later that year, it was confirmed Ilse signed a new contract with Universal Music.

Her first release on the new label was the single The Great Escape, peaking at No. 11 in the Dutch Top 40. Her fourth studio album The Great Escape, was released on 16 June 2006. It went gold only a week after its release and went 2× Platinum only months later. In September the second single The Lonely One was released, which peaked at No. 12 in the Single Top 100. Third single, I Love You, was released in February 2007 and peaked at No. 23 in the Dutch Top 40. The song was included on the soundtrack for the Dutch movie adaptation of Steel Magnolias. Then the song Reach for the Light was released as a promo-only single, nevertheless it charted at No. 51. In October 2007 she released a live album, simply called Live.

2008–2010: Incredible and Next to Me EP
In 2008 Ilse stated she was writing and recording a new album in the Swedish city of Gothenburg. Before that, she went to England to work with the same songwriters which were working on the debut album of James Morrison. The first single of her forthcoming album was So Incredible, which peaked at No. 6. The album Incredible was released at 17 October 2008 and went platinum in less than a month. It eventually got 5× Platinum. Her next single Miracle came to be her biggest hit to date, reaching the top spot of the Dutch Top 40. It was written as the title track for the Dutch movie Bride Flight. Third single  Puzzle Me peaked at No. 5 and radio-only release We're Alright peaked at No. 21, in spite of it not being released as a single.

After releasing another live album, Ilse started working on new material. The single Next To Me was released in July 2010 and reached a #9-spot. Her first EP Next To Me, was released at 27 August 2010. The album only included eight tracks, Ilse explaining that "...she wanted to release new material more often, but due to a heavy touring schedule and contractual obligations didn't have the time to record a whole album". Second single Beautiful Distraction charted at No. 18 and third single Carousel peaked at No. 32. In early 2011, Next To Me has been certified 2× Platinum.

2011–2012: Shelved album DoLuv2LuvU and Eye of the Hurricane

In November 2011 DeLange released her new single DoLuv2LuvU. The song was the theme song of Serious Request 2011, a big charity-event held yearly by Dutch radio station 3FM. While promoting the single, DeLange heard her father was incurably ill. She immediately stopped all kinds of promotion and postponed the recording process of her new album DoLuv2LuvU. Though the song wasn't promoted, it still charted at No. 14. A day after her father's death, on 10 January 2012, she posted an acoustic version of her song Without You on Twitter, which featured on her 2007 live album. Later that year, Ilse revealed that the DoLuv2LuvU-album was shelved and she started recording a new album. This is because she didn't feel the flow of the album anymore after her father had died. She doesn't rule out the possibility it's going to be released in the future. In June 2012, the first single from her second album, Hurricane was released. It charted at No. 23 in the Dutch Top 40. Her seventh album Eye of the Hurricane, was released 14 September 2012 and got Platinum in only a few weeks. Second single Winter of Love rose to No. 20 and third single We Are One got to No. 33.

2013–present: The Voice of Holland, The Common Linnets and Nashville

In 2013, DeLange replaced Nick & Simon as a coach on The Voice of Holland for its fourth season alongside Marco Borsato, Trijntje Oosterhuis and Ali B (who replaced Roel van Velzen). When the live shows started, DeLange released her second compilation album, called After The Hurricane. The first single Blue Bittersweet was written as a soundtrack for the Dutch movie "Het Diner" ("Dinner") and charted to No. 8.

DeLange represented the Netherlands, with singer Waylon as The Common Linnets, during the Eurovision Song Contest 2014 in Copenhagen, Denmark. They took second place after the winner Conchita Wurst from Austria. She returned to The Voice of Holland as a coach for its fifth season in August. On 15 January 2015, it was announced that DeLange would be replaced as a coach for the sixth season of The Voice of Holland by Miss Montreal lead singer Sanne Hans. DeLange decided she wanted to spend more time on her international career with The Common Linnets. However, she was announced as the new coach for the fifth season of The Voice Kids, replacing Angela Groothuizen.

On 7 December 2017 it was revealed that DeLange would have a recurring role in the final season of the ABC/CMT musical-drama series Nashville.

in 2018, DeLange also has been a coach for The Voice Senior.

DeLange was part of the Dutch delegation for the Eurovision Song Contest 2019 as an artistic consultant and mentor to the Dutch representative Duncan Laurence, whom she coached during the fifth season of The Voice of Holland. Laurence went on to win the contest.

In 2021, DeLange took part in the fourteenth season of the German dance competition series Let's Dance, following in the footsteps of fellow Dutch candidates Loiza Lamers, Sylvie Meis, Marijke Amado and Bastiaan Ragas. However, she withdrew from the competition on 3 May, citing a foot injury as her reason for withdrawal.

Discography 

 World of Hurt (1998)
 Dear John, (1999)
 Livin' on Love (2000)
 Clean Up (2003)
 The Great Escape (2006)
 Incredible (2008)
 Next to Me (2010)
 Eye of the Hurricane (2012)
 The Common Linnets (2014) with The Common Linnets
 II (2015) with The Common Linnets
 Ilse DeLange (2018)
Gravel & Dust (2019)
Changes (2020)

Awards

References

External links 

 

1977 births
Living people
21st-century Dutch singers
21st-century Dutch women singers
Dutch country singers
Dutch pop singers
English-language singers from the Netherlands
Musicians from Overijssel
People from Almelo
Eurovision Song Contest entrants of 2014
Eurovision Song Contest entrants for the Netherlands